The 2007 Southland Conference baseball tournament was held from May 23 through 26, 2007 to determine the champion of the Southland Conference in the sport of college baseball for the 2007 season.  The event pitted the top six finishers from the conference's regular season in a double-elimination tournament held at H. Alvin Brown–C. C. Stroud Field, home field of Northwestern State in Natchitoches, Louisiana.  Fourth-seeded  won their second overall championship, and what would be the first of three consecutive titles, and claimed the automatic bid to the 2007 NCAA Division I baseball tournament.

Seeding and format
The top six finishers from the regular season were seeded one through six, regardless of division.  They played a double-elimination tournament.  Despite the seeding, the two division champions were protected, so that third-seeded Lamar played fifth seeded McNeese State in the first round.

Bracket and results

All-Tournament Team
The following players were named to the All-Tournament Team.

Most Valuable Player
Luke Prihoda was named Tournament Most Valuable Player.  Prihoda was a pitcher for Sam Houston State.

References

Tournament
Southland Conference Baseball Tournament
Southland Conference baseball tournament
Southland Conference baseball tournament